Luz Elena González (better known as Luz Elena; born Luz Elena González de la Torre on August 22, 1974, in Guadalajara, Jalisco, Jalisco) is a Mexican actress and model.

In 1994 she won the beauty contest Nuestra Belleza Jalisco 1994 and participated in the national beauty contest Nuestra Belleza México 1994, finishing in fifth place.

Professional life 
González's professional acting career began in 1996 with the telenovela Mi querida Isabel. In 1997, she co-hosted with Jorge Ortiz de Pinedo the night variety entertainment program Al ritmo de la noche. She starred as the antagonist in Emilio Larrosa's telenovela Libre para amarte.

Personal life 
In 2009, she married Bernardo Martínez. They have a son, Santiago, and a daughter, María José.

Filmography

Awards and nominations

Premios TVyNovelas

Premios People en Español

References

External links 
 
 Luz Elena González biography esmas.com at the esmas
 Luz Elena González biography from Las Noticias México

1970 births
Living people
Mexican telenovela actresses
Mexican television actresses
Mexican female models
Mexican television personalities
20th-century Mexican actresses
21st-century Mexican actresses
Actresses from Guadalajara, Jalisco